Although there were many householder-yogis in Tibet, monasticism was the foundation of Buddhism in Tibet. There were over 6,000 monasteries in Tibet. However, nearly all of these were ransacked and destroyed by Red Guards during the Cultural Revolution. Most of the major monasteries have been at least partially re-established, while many others remain in ruins.

Mongolian Buddhism derives from the Gelug school of Tibetan Buddhism. In Mongolia during the 1920s, approximately one third of males were monks, though many lived outside monasteries. By the beginning of the 20th century about 750 monasteries were functioning in Mongolia. These monasteries were largely dismantled during Communist rule, but many have been reestablished during the Buddhist revival in Mongolia which followed the fall of Communism.

Monasteries generally adhere to one particular school. Some of the major centers in each tradition are as follows:

Nyingma lineage is said to have "six mother monasteries" each of which has numerous associated branch monasteries:
 Mindrolling Monastery
 Katok Monastery
 Dorje Drak
 Dzogchen Monastery
 Palyul
 Shechen Monastery

Samye the first monastery in Tibet, established by Padmasambhāva and Śāntarakṣita was later taken over by the Sakya tradition.

Kagyu monasteries are mostly in Kham, eastern Tibet. Tsurphu and Ralung are in central Tibet:
 Drigung Monastery — the seat of the Könchog Tenzin Kunzang Thinley Lhundrub
 Palpung Monastery — the seat of the Tai Situpa and Jamgon Kongtrul
 Ralung Monastery — the seat of the Gyalwang Drukpa
 Surmang Monastery — the seat of the Trungpa tülkus
 Tsurphu Monastery — the seat of the Gyalwa Karmapa

Sakya monasteries:
 Ngor
 Sakya Monastery — the seat of the Sakya Trizin
 Shalu

Gelug first three centers are also called 'great three' and are near Lhasa:
 Drepung Monastery — the home monastery of the Dalai Lama
 Ganden Monastery — the seat of the Ganden Tripa
 Sera Monastery
 Tashilhunpo Monastery in Shigatse — founded by the first Dalai Lama, now the seat of the Panchen Lama

Jonang main centers of the more than 70 active monasteries:
 Takten Phuntsok Ling Monastery  Shimla,  gift from the Dalai Lama - seat of Khalkha Jetsun Dhampa Rinpoche
 Jonang Shimla Monastery  - seat of Khenpo Choekyi Nangwa Rinpoche
 Tsangwa Monastery in Dzamthang is one of the largest with home to about 1,500 monks

Bön main two centers which has a Geshe program and its nunnery:
 Menri, re-founded in Himachal Pradesh - seat of the 33rd abbot Menri Trizin
 Triten Norbutse Monastery in Nepal
 The Redna Menling Nunnery

Other monasteries with particularly important regional influence:
 Mahayana Monastery — the seat of the Kadhampa Dharmaraja (The 25th Atisha Jiangqiu Tilei), Nepal
 Labrang Monastery in eastern Amdo
 Kumbum Jampaling in central Amdo
 Jokhang Temple in Lhasa — said to have been built by King Songtsen Gampo in 647 AD part of the UNESCO Tsangwa

Footnotes

External links
 Famous Monasteries of Tibet

Tibetan Buddhist practices
Monasticism